UoSAT-1, also known as UoSAT-OSCAR 9 (UO-9), was a British amateur radio satellite which orbited Earth. It was built at the University of Surrey and launched into low Earth orbit on 6 October 1981. It exceeded its anticipated two-year orbital lifespan by six years, having received signals on 13 October 1989, before re-entering the atmosphere.

This was the first of several UoSAT satellites; followed by UoSAT-2.

Mission
Like its successor UoSAT-2 it carried a CCD camera and a Digitalker speech synthesiser, and transmitted telemetry data on a 145.826 MHz beacon at 1200 baud using asynchronous AFSK.

The Astrid package sold by British firm MM Microwave, consisting of a fixed frequency VHF receiver set and software for the BBC Micro, could display the telemetry frames from either UoSAT-1 or UoSAT-2.
UoSAT-1's solar arrays were of an experimental design reused for UoSAT-2.

Computers and Data Processing 
The primary computer for the satellite was the RCA 1802 microprocessor. A secondary microprocessor was also employed, the "F100L" (a Ferranti 16-bit processor). Memory was 16K of DRAM.

References

University of Surrey
Amateur radio satellites
Satellites of the United Kingdom
Spacecraft launched in 1981